Neches is an unincorporated community in east central Anderson County, in the U.S. state of Texas. According to the Handbook of Texas, the community had a population of 175 in 2000. It is located within the Palestine, Texas micropolitan area.

History
In 1872, the International-Great Northern Railroad was built through the area of Neches. J.J. Davis and Murdock McDonald, local landowners, donated land to be used for the expansion of the townsite and a train station.

Neches' first post office, which opened the same year as the town, was called Nechesville. A Masonic lodge, two steam-powered sawmills, a gristmill, two churches, two general stores, and two saloons were in operation in the community by 1884 and the community had 100 inhabitants living in it. The community shipped lumber. Two cotton gins and a hotel were then added to the community's business directory by 1890 and had a large growth in population with 400 settlers. A local store owner named J.B. McDonald also acted as Justice of the Peace in Nechesville and advertised as a supplier of "meats and justice." The community's name was then changed to Neches in 1892. The community then published two newspapers: the Southern Poultry Journal in 1896 and the Neches Tribune before the 1930s. Its population decreased to 261 people in 1900 and then grew back to 400 in the 1920s, which stayed around that in the 1930s. Neches had 24 businesses operating, as well as a population zenith of 900 in 1939, making it an extremely successful community. It began to fade not long after. Its population plunged to 280 in 1949 and continued to fall to 111 in 1970. There were three churches, two community halls, and six operating businesses in 1985. Its population grew to 114 in 1990 and then jumped some more to 175 in 2000.

Although it is unincorporated, Neches has a post office, with the ZIP code of 75779.

Geography

Climate
The climate in this area is characterized by hot, humid summers and generally mild to cool winters. According to the Köppen Climate Classification system, Neches has a humid subtropical climate, abbreviated "Cfa" on climate maps.

Education
The first school was built in the community in 1872 and another one appeared in 1884. A charter school called Stovall Academy was in operation three miles from Neches in 1866. It was then moved to the settlement and was renamed the Neches Normal Institute and then Neches High School, which it currently goes by to this day. It also had a school in 1985.

Today, the community is served by the Neches Independent School District, which is home to the Neches High School Tigers.

Notable residents

Gary Brown - bass player of Whiskey Myers
Cody Cannon - lead singer of Whiskey Myers

References

Unincorporated communities in Texas
Unincorporated communities in Anderson County, Texas